Volksrods are modified Volkswagen beetles. They are used as an alternative to traditional Ford-based hot rods. Classic Ford Model Ts and Model As are becoming more scarce and more valuable than ever. VW Beetles are much more affordable, easier to find, and easier to find parts for. It is also a 1930s design, which is well-suited to hot-rodding's roots and tradition.

As with all types of car customization, various modifications are practiced in different combinations. One popular method of conversion involves removing all body molding, bumpers and fenders, then installing a classic Ford front axle to move the wheels forward and give the car a low, stretched look. Another popular customization is to move the stock Volkswagen axle beam forward or reverse the trailing/torsion arms and re-work the steering linkages. A Volksrod might be finished off with a chopped top and original VW wheels. Paint jobs may be flat black, or more elaborate, including with pinstriping. While Volksrods may be very elaborate, like any hot rod, many are built with few or no expensive chrome-plated or machined aluminum parts, but handmade by a "cut, weld and drive" owner, with simple mechanical tools, welding equipment and basic parts.

See also
Baja bug
Cal looker
Cal-Style VW
Formula Vee
Meyers Manx

References

"How to Build Volkswage Hot Rods", VW Trends article
"Volksrods" JustCustomz.com article

External links

 Volksrods.com.
 Volksrods on Tumblr
 Volksrod gallery pool on Flickr
 Another Volksrods site with gallery
 Das Rod

Kustom Kulture
Volkswagen Beetle modifications